The 2014–2015 Jordanian Pro League (known as the Al-Manaseer Jordanian Pro League, named after Ziad AL-Manaseer Companies Group for sponsorship reasons) was the 63rd season of the Jordan League, the top Jordanian professional league for football clubs, since its establishment in 1944. The first match was played on 12 September 2014 and the season finished in May 2015.

Teams

Map

League table

Positions by round
The table lists the positions of teams after each week of matches.

Results

Statistics

Top goalscorers

References

Jordanian Pro League seasons
Jord
1